This list of fictional cats and other felines is subsidiary to the list of fictional cats. It is restricted solely to notable feline characters from notable animated television shows and film. For characters that appear in several separate television series, only the earliest series will be recorded here.

See also
List of fictional cats

References

 
Animation
Fictional cats in animation
Cats